Vestfjellet is a mountain in Hof, Vestfold, Norway. It is located one kilometer south of Skibergfjellet, Vestfold County's highest mountain. At Vestfjellet, which has an elevation of 621 meters, there are panoramic views of Gaustatoppen, Styggemann, Lågen, Eikeren, and lakes such as Hajeren and Øksne.

See also
 List of highest points of Norwegian counties

References

Mountains of Vestfold og Telemark
Hof, Vestfold